Heaston is a surname. Notable people with the surname include:

Kristin Heaston (born 1975), American shot putter
Liz Heaston (born 1977), American optometrist and former college football and soccer player
Nicole Heaston, American soprano

See also
Heston (name)